In enzymology, a 4-hydroxyglutamate transaminase is an enzyme that catalyzes the chemical reaction

4-hydroxy-L-glutamate + 2-oxoglutarate  4-hydroxy-2-oxoglutarate + L-glutamate

Thus, the two substrates of this enzyme are 4-hydroxy-L-glutamate and 2-oxoglutarate, whereas its two products are 4-hydroxy-2-oxoglutarate and L-glutamate.

This enzyme belongs to the family of transferases, specifically the transaminases, which transfer nitrogenous groups.  The systematic name of this enzyme class is 4-hydroxy-L-glutamate:2-oxoglutarate aminotransferase. This enzyme is also called 4-hydroxyglutamate aminotransferase.  This enzyme participates in arginine and proline metabolism.

References

 
 

EC 2.6.1
Enzymes of unknown structure